Robert Arthur "Bob" Rose (7 August 1928 – 7 July 2003) was an Australian rules footballer and coach in the VFL. He is widely regarded as the greatest player ever to play for Collingwood.

Playing career
A Collingwood legend, he has had achievements of the many including the greatest honours for a club, and in the VFL/AFL. From country club Nyah West, Rose debuted in 1946. He was a genuine all-round sportsman, who was looking down the path of a professional boxing career, but decided to play the game of football. Rose was courageous in the midfield, and was very skillful on both sides. His honours included four best and fairest awards, was a leading goalkicker in a premiership season, including All-Australian honours. Rose however didn't win the Brownlow Medal despite being up in the mix on several occasions, coming second in 1953. Rose also, as an icon of the club, never was given the role as captain due to the strong leaders playing for the Pies.

Rose played in 3 Grand Finals, in years 1952, 1953 and 1955, including one premiership, in 1953. Injuries had got the better of him though, and retired in 1955 after 152 games, and kicked 214 goals, with the losing Grand Final being his last match.

Rose was inducted into the Australian Football Hall of Fame in 1996. He was selected as the centre in Collingwood's Team of the Century, and the AFL Players Association's annual award for Most Courageous Player, struck in 1991, is named in Rose's honour.

Coaching career
In 1956 Rose was appointed Captain-Coach of Wangaratta Rovers in the O&MFL, Rose had moved to Wangaratta to open a sporting goods store. He led the Wangaratta Rovers to premierships in 1958 and 1960, runners up in 1959 and 1962. Rose was the Leagues leading goalkicker in 1960. Rose was also the Leagues Morris Medal winner in 1958 and 1960.

Collingwood Football Club senior coach (1964–1971) 
Rose returned to the VFL in a coaching capacity, taking over from Phonse Kyne in 1964 as Collingwood Football Club senior coach. He led the side to the Grand Final in 1964, 1966 and 1970, losing each time by a handful of points. He continued to coach Collingwood until 1971 (apart from one game in 1967 when Neil Mann, who later became his successor as senior coach, took the reins).

Footscray Football Club senior coach (1972–1975) 
Rose went to coach the Footscray Football Club as senior coach between 1972 and 1975.

Collingwood Football Club senior coach (1985–1986) 
Rose returned for a second and final stint as senior coach of Collingwood from 1985 to 1986, where he replaced John Cahill at the end of the 1984 season. In the 1985 season, Rose guided Collingwood to finish seventh on the ladder, missing out of the finals with ten wins and twelve losses. Rose would hold the reins for a brief period before Collingwood's severe financial crisis and poor form on the field led to his resignation in favour of assistant coach Leigh Matthews who replaced Rose as Collingwood senior coach after Round 3, in the 1986 season.

Post AFL Senior coaching roles
Rose continued to remain around the Collingwood Football Club behind the scenes right up until his death.

In 2009 The Australian nominated Rose as one of the 25 greatest footballers never to win a Brownlow medal.

Family
He was the father of Robert Rose, a cricketer and footballer; and Peter Rose, a poet and novelist.

Death
Rose died at Cabrini Hospital after a short battle with cancer on 7 July 2003. A small group of Collingwood players, including Nathan Buckley, paid a visit to Rose in the final week before his death. Rhyce Shaw was the man who wore Rose's no.22 during the time of illness, and would occasionally have initialed B.R above the number in dedication to Bob.

Legacy
 
In 2006, a memorial statue of Rose was unveiled outside the main entrance of the Melbourne Sports and Entertainment Centre, the home of the Collingwood Football Club. Present at the unveiling was the widow of Rose, Elsie Rose, and son Peter Rose, an accomplished poet and novelist.

Quotations
On his relationship with Collingwood supporters:

"The first practice game I played I couldn't find the right gate to get into the ground. I was there about two hours before anybody else. One of the really strong things was about my third year of playing for Collingwood, and I walked into the ground at about 11 o'clock, to watch the reserves play. (By this time I was in the seniors.) And I just saw all these Collingwood supporters. It was a cold, middle-of-the-winter, rainy day, and they had taken up every seat available in the ground, and it was mainly standing room in those days. And I thought then, it really hit me, that these people are there to support people like me, all the players, so it was a real lesson that I would, and I swore to myself, that I would never let the people down, that I would give 100% all the time. And it was really an inspiration to me..."

On his first day of training at Victoria Park aged 18:

"So when we got to Melbourne on the Thursday, he took me out to Collingwood, and I trained out there for the first night and that was unbelievable. I was 15 at the time, and to be with the Lou Richards and Colliers (the Colliers had finished playing, but they were always at the Club) Phonse Kyne and those great players, Fothergill, I could hardly believe it, and I was in some pretty shabby old gear because the war had just finished and things were pretty tough in Nyah West, so yes, Lou Richards and the boys have let me know over the years about that silly-looking green and white guernsey that I was wearing, with motheaten holes in it. But it was really a bombshell to be able to run out on to the nice green grass, because droughts were pretty prominent in the Mallee at that time, and we were almost playing on clay grounds..."

References

Further reading
 Strevens, Steve. Bob Rose: A dignified life. Sydney: Allen & Unwin, 2004.

External links

 
 
 Collingwood team of the Century
 AFL: Hall of Fame

Collingwood Football Club players
Collingwood Football Club Premiership players
1928 births
2003 deaths
Copeland Trophy winners
Collingwood Football Club coaches
Western Bulldogs coaches
Australian Football Hall of Fame inductees
All-Australians (1953–1988)
Deaths from cancer in Victoria (Australia)
Australian rules footballers from Victoria (Australia)
Wangaratta Rovers Football Club players
Wangaratta Rovers Football Club coaches
One-time VFL/AFL Premiership players